Euonymus oxyphyllus, the Korean spindle tree, is a species of flowering plant in the family Celastraceae, native to central and eastern China (including Taiwan), Manchuria, Korea, Japan and the Kurils. It is a shrub or small tree typically reaching . The Royal Horticultural Society considers it to be a good tree for smaller gardens, especially for its colorful Autumn foliage and fruits.

References

oxyphyllus
Ornamental trees
Flora of North-Central China
Flora of South-Central China
Flora of Southeast China
Flora of Manchuria
Flora of Eastern Asia
Plants described in 1865